Women of the House is an American sitcom television series and a spin-off of Designing Women that aired on CBS from January 4 to August 18, 1995, and the last four episodes airing on Lifetime on September 8, 1995. The series starred Delta Burke, reprising her role of Suzanne Sugarbaker, who had reconciled with producers of Designing Women after a bitter, highly publicized, off-screen battle.

Premise 
Suzanne Sugarbaker's latest husband has died, and as his widow, she assumes his political office for the remainder of his term. Washington, D.C. was ill-prepared for the outspoken, "big, dumb, hick beauty queen's" arrival to the United States House of Representatives, though she did form an unusual bond with then-current President Bill Clinton, who was frequently heard off-screen. Along with her, Suzanne dragged her mentally disabled brother Jim (Jonathan Banks); her young, adopted daughter Desiree (Brittany Parkyn); and her often mentioned (but only once seen) maid, Sapphire Jones (Barbara Montgomery).

Teri Garr starred as Suzanne's press secretary Sissy Emerson, a washed up reporter who had turned to the bottle a few years earlier, but was starting to clean up her act. Patricia Heaton portrayed Natty Hollingsworth, Suzanne's snooty, conservative administrative assistant whose married Congressman boyfriend was serving a prison sentence. Jennifer Malone (Valerie Mahaffey, Julie Hagerty), known to her co-workers as "Malone," was a vivacious, naïve housewife who was recently left by her husband, and whose children were tyrants. Years of sexual repression had taken their toll on Malone and she had begun to become obsessed with sex.

Malone was later replaced by Veda Walkman (Lisa Rieffel), a ditzy young woman who took an internship at the office. In more minor roles were William Newman as Dave, an older gentleman with bad arthritis who worked in the office and Adam Carl as Adam, another intern (which was not the same-named character Carl played in several episodes of Designing Women).

Cast

Main
 Delta Burke as Suzanne Sugarbaker
 Teri Garr as Sissy Emerson, Suzanne's press secretary
 Patricia Heaton as Natalie "Natty" Hollingsworth, Suzanne's administrative assistant
 Valerie Mahaffey (episodes 1-4, 7) and Julie Hagerty (episodes 5-6) as Jennifer Malone, Suzanne's receptionist
 Lisa Rieffel (episodes 8-12) as Veda Walkman, Suzanne's Congressional intern

Recurring
 Jonathan Banks as Jim Sugarbaker, Suzanne's intellectually disabled brother
 Brittany Parkyn as Desiree "Desi" Sugarbaker, Suzanne's adoptive daughter
 William Newman as Dave, another member of Suzanne's staff
 Adam Carl as Adam

Notable guest stars
 Jamie Farr guest starred as himself in the episode "Guess Who's Sleeping in Lincoln's Bed?", and he gave a nod to the series M*A*S*H by appearing in drag.  Amongst the writing staff of M*A*S*H was Women of the House writer/creator Linda Bloodworth-Thomason.
 Gerald McRaney made an appearance in "The Afternoon Wife," playing Suzanne's ex-husband, novelist Dash Goff, a character that originated on Designing Women.  By this point, McRaney and series lead Delta Burke were married in real life.
 Meshach Taylor reprised his Designing Women role of Anthony Bouvier in the episode "Dear Diary."
 Susan Powter was initially announced as a cast member of the series. She finally showed up in the penultimate episode, "Dear Diary."
 Charles Frank appeared as the oft-spoken of Congressman Ed Sharkey in the final episode, "The Conjugal Cottage." Frank starred opposite Delta Burke and Dixie Carter in Linda Bloodworth-Thomason's 1982 sitcom Filthy Rich.
 Telma Hopkins starred as a wisecracking cop in the episode "The Conjugal Cottage."
 The episode "Women in Film" featured cameos by Loni Anderson, Roseanne Barr, Carol Burnett, Brett Butler, Rita Moreno, Marilyn Chambers, Marilyn McCoo, Deidre Hall, Elizabeth Ashley, Joan Van Ark, and Stefanie Powers.

Episodes

Home media
Mill Creek Entertainment had secured the rights to the complete series, which was slated to be released on DVD in early 2011. In April 2011, it was announced that the DVD release had been cancelled due to "issues surrounding the source material delivery." On February 6, 2018, Questar Entertainment released Women of the House: The Complete Series on DVD in Region 1.

References

External links
 Women of the House at Designing Women Online
 
 Women of the House Magazine
 Jump The Shark – Women of the House

1995 American television series debuts
1995 American television series endings
1990s American sitcoms
1990s American political comedy television series
1990s American workplace comedy television series
American television spin-offs
CBS original programming
Television series by Sony Pictures Television
Lifetime (TV network) original programming
Television shows set in Washington, D.C.
Television series created by Linda Bloodworth-Thomason
Designing Women